Hugh Williamson (1735–1819) was an American politician.

Hugh Williamson may also refer to:

Hugh Ross Williamson (1901–1978), British historian and dramatist
Hugh D.T. Williamson (1901–1985), Australian banking executive and philanthropist
Hugh Williamson (book designer) (1918–1992), British book designer and author
Hugh G. M. Williamson (born 1947), Regius Professor of Hebrew at the University of Oxford
Hugh Williamson, Europe and Central Asia director at Human Rights Watch.

See also
Williamson (surname)